Edward Fellowes, 1st Baron de Ramsey DL (14 May 1809 – 9 August 1887) was a British Conservative Member of Parliament.

De Ramsey was the son of William Henry Fellowes, of Ramsey Abbey in Huntingdonshire, and Emma Benyon. He was elected to the House of Commons for Huntingdonshire in 1837, a seat he held for 43 years, until 1880. In July 1887, only a month before his death, he was raised to the peerage as Baron de Ramsey, of Ramsey Abbey in the County of Huntingdon.

His seat was Haveringland Hall.

Lord de Ramsey married, in 1845, Hon. Mary Julia Milles, daughter of George Milles, 4th Baron Sondes. He died in August 1887, aged 78, and was succeeded in the barony by his eldest son William Henry Fellowes. The Dowager Lady de Ramsey died 10 April 1901. Their younger son Ailwyn Fellowes was a Conservative politician, elevated to the peerage as Baron Ailwyn in 1921.

Notes

References 
Kidd, Charles, Williamson, David (editors). Debrett's Peerage and Baronetage (1990 edition). New York: St Martin's Press, 1990,

External links 
 

1809 births
1887 deaths
Barons in the Peerage of the United Kingdom
Conservative Party (UK) Baronesses- and Lords-in-Waiting
Deputy Lieutenants of Huntingdonshire
Deputy Lieutenants of Norfolk
Fellowes, Edward
Fellowes, Edward
Fellowes, Edward
Fellowes, Edward
Fellowes, Edward
Fellowes, Edward
Fellowes, Edward
Fellowes, Edward
Fellowes, Edward
Fellowes, Edward
UK MPs who were granted peerages
People from Broadland (district)
Peers of the United Kingdom created by Queen Victoria